The 2004 World Rowing Championships were World Rowing Championships that were held from 27 July to 1 August 2004 in conjunction with the World Junior Rowing Championships on lake Banyoles in Catalonia, Spain. Since 2004 was an Olympic year for rowing, the World Championships did not include Olympic events scheduled for the 2004 Summer Olympics.

Medal summary

Men's events
 Non-Olympic classes

Women's events
 Non-Olympic classes

Adaptive rowing
Three boat classes competed at the adaptive rowing event held from 29 July to 1 August: AS men's single sculls (ASM1x), LTA mixed coxed four (LTAMix4+), and TA mixed double sculls (TAMix2x).

Medal table

References

World Rowing Championships
World Rowing Championships, 2004
World Rowing Championships, 2004
Rowing competitions in Spain
International sports competitions hosted by Catalonia
Rowing
Rowing